The siege of Kenilworth (21 June – December 1266), also known as the great siege of 1266, was a six-month siege of Kenilworth Castle and a battle of the Second Barons' War. The siege was a part of an English civil war fought from 1264 to 1267 by the forces of Simon de Montfort against the Royalist forces led by Prince Edward (later Edward I of England). The siege was one of few castle attacks to take place during the war.

Castle defences
Kenilworth Castle's structure was unique and contributed to the longevity of the siege. The castle was a formidable structure due to its heavy defences. The most notable defence was a dam to the south of the castle, across which a causeway led from the entrance to the bailey and keep. Behind the dam was an artificial lake along the south and west sides of the castle, protecting it from a land approach. Ditches along the north side and a second pool on the east side of the causeway extended the water protection to surround the castle.

Siege
The feudal summons for the siege was pushed back from December 1265, finally occurring on 21 June the next year. From that point on, the siege occurred in earnest. The castle's garrison was large, over a thousand, usually estimated at twelve hundred men, and active in defending themselves. Outside of the castle was the feudal host of England as summoned by Henry III, along with his  sons, the Lord Edward and Edmund, who had been attempting to contain the garrison since the prior autumn.

The attack on Kenilworth Castle began on 21 June. It was the largest siege to ever occur in England. The royal forces tried all manners of devices. Numerous stone-throwing devices, presumably trebuchets, were brought to the siege, as well as "turres ligneas", or wooden towers. An "ursus" or "bear" was built, with separate compartments for archers. Barges were sent from Chester to attempt an attack via the lake; this did not work.

The Dictum of Kenilworth
Archbishop William Freney tried to negotiate with the garrison, but was refused entry. Time, however, was the only weapon left at their disposal, and the patient waiting finally paid off; with the garrison running out of food and suffering from disease, they finally surrendered on 13 December 1266 and accepted the terms of the Dictum of Kenilworth, which later became part of the Statute of Marlborough, four chapters of which are still in force in English law.

References

Sieges of the Middle Ages
Battles of the Barons' Wars
1260s conflicts
Warfare in medieval England
Sieges involving England
1266 in England
Conflicts in 1266